Stuart Leslie is a Belizean public servant and ambassador. He served as Belize's Permanent Representative to the United Nations from 2000 to 2005.  He served as Belize's Chief Elections Officer from September 2005 to December 2006.  In January 2006, he took up a new appointment as the Ambassador of Trade in the Ministry of Foreign Affairs and Foreign Trade.

Following the retirement of Sir Colville Young on 30 April 2021, he became acting Governor-General of Belize. Leslie served in that capacity until Froyla Tzalam was sworn in as the new Governor-General.

References

Belizean diplomats
Governors-General of Belize
Living people
Year of birth missing (living people)
Permanent Representatives of Belize to the United Nations